The Buick Club of America (BCA), founded in 1966, is a non-profit organization dedicated to the preservation and restoration of automobiles built by the Buick Motor Division of General Motors Corporation. The Buick Club promotes activities, resources, and friendships. The Buick Club has 8,000+ worldwide members and 70+ local Chapters in nine regions. These chapters promote local networking among Buick enthusiasts. The Club also has seven divisions based on vehicle types instead on geographic locations. One must be a member of the national organization to be a member of a division or chapter.

The Buick Club of America is not affiliated with Buick Motor Division, nor with General Motors.

Membership 
The Buick Club of America is a renowned and respected club and offers domestic and international memberships for anyone interested in the Buick automobile.  Ownership of a Buick is not a requirement of membership.

Activities

The Buick Bugle 
The monthly magazine of the Buick Club of America is the Buick Bugle. The magazine features a variety of types of articles, including year and model specific authenticity features, historical documentation, personal interest stories, and technical tips. The magazine also features Buick-related advertisements for parts and services as well as member classified ads for cars, parts, and other related items.

Website and internet forum 
The BCA maintains as website containing general and historic information and events calendars.  Through this website, members may also access internet forums to discuss specific issues.

National Meet 
Each year the Buick Club of America host their National Meet. There is only one BCA National Meet and it moves around the United States. Historically the Meet has been hosted by a Chapter or Region of the BCA. Beginning in 2013 the meet will be hosted by the BCA National Meet Committee.

The National Meet features various competitions for different classes of automobiles:
 Restored or excellent condition unrestored vehicles 12 or more years old
 Unrestored vehicles 25 or more years old of any condition
 Drivers award—awarded to a vehicle 25 or more years old that is driven (i.e. not transported) from the owner's home to the meet location (indicating ongoing road-worthiness).
 Modified Vehicles in categories of Mild / Resto Rod / Radical / Driven    
 Display only vehicles of all years to current

Some of the Regions of the BCA host Annual Regional Meets or Tours.

Divisions of the BCA hold annual tours and activities as well, some in conjunction with the BCA National Meet.

Locations of National Meets

Technical Advisors Program 
The BCA Technical Advisory Program consist of volunteer advisors who are knowledgeable about specific Buick vehicle eras, years, models or engines and assist other members with technical questions.

Famous members
 Joe Mantegna, actor

References

External links
https://web.archive.org/web/20111118222352/http://en.wikicollecting.org/buick-club-of-america
http://www.hemmings.com/clubs/detail.html?hmn_club_id=1684

Buick
Automobile associations in the United States